The 1948–49 Football League season was Birmingham City Football Club's 46th in the Football League and their 27th in the First Division, having been promoted as Second Division champions in 1947–48. They finished in 17th position in the 22-team division, having both scored fewer and conceded fewer goals than any other team in the division. They entered the 1948–49 FA Cup at the third round proper and lost to Leicester City in that round after two replays.

In November 1948, Harry Storer resigned as team manager. The club's chief scout, Walter Taylor, was appointed as assistant team manager shortly afterwards and acted as caretaker manager until Bob Brocklebank's appointment in January 1949.

Thirty-one players made at least one appearance in nationally organised competition, and there were twelve different goalscorers. Full-back Ken Green missed only one game of the 45-game season, and Jackie Stewart was leading goalscorer with eleven goals, all scored in the league.

Football League First Division

League table (part)

FA Cup

Appearances and goals

Players with name struck through and marked  left the club during the playing season.

See also
Birmingham City F.C. seasons

References
General
 
 
 Source for match dates and results: 
 Source for lineups, appearances, goalscorers and attendances: Matthews (2010), Complete Record, pp. 332–33.
 Source for kit: "Birmingham City". Historical Football Kits. Retrieved 22 May 2018.

Specific

Birmingham City F.C. seasons
Birmingham City